WRSB may refer to:

 WRSB (AM), a radio station (1590 AM) licensed to serve Brockport, New York, United States
 WOKR (AM), a radio station (1310 AM) licensed to serve Canandaigua, New York, which held the call sign WRSB from 1998 to 2017
 Wire rope safety barrier, a cable barrier